The Ruger Wrangler is a single-action rimfire revolver produced by Sturm, Ruger & Co. Chambered for .22 Long Rifle cartridges, it was announced in April 2019. The revolver makes extensive use of aluminum and zinc castings for ease of manufacturability, and also has an unfluted cylinder and uses metal injection molded components for further cost reduction. The Wrangler's price point of $250 has been described as "very attractive", and is less than half the MSRP of Ruger's Single-Six and Bearcat models.

References

External links
 Ruger Wrangler by Hickok45 via YouTube
 Ruger Wrangler VS Heritage Rough Rider by Hickok45 via YouTube

Ruger revolvers
Single-action revolvers
.22 LR revolvers
Weapons and ammunition introduced in 2019